Theodore Taylor (February 16, 1934 – October 23, 1987) was an American blues singer.

Biography
Taylor was born in Okmulgee, Oklahoma, and moved to California in 1952.  He became a member of the Mighty Clouds of Joy gospel group, before joining the Santa Monica Soul Seekers as a tenor singer.  In 1955, the Soul Seekers approached Maxwell Davis at Modern Records for a recording deal, and he persuaded them to concentrate on secular R&B music.  The same group recorded as both The Cadets on Modern and The Jacks on the subsidiary RPM label.  Taylor sang lead vocals on The Cadets' "Do You Wanna Rock (Hey Little Girl)" and "I Cry" and also on The Jacks' "Away" and "My Darling."  He did not appear on The Cadets' biggest hit, "Stranded In The Jungle" in 1955; for that session, he was replaced by Prentice Moreland.

Taylor left the group, and recorded two singles on Melatone Records in 1957 with the Bob Reed orchestra on which he was credited for contractual reasons as "Ivory Lucky".  Over the next seven years, he recorded singles for a succession of labels including Ebb, Duke, Top Rank International, Laurie (where several of his records were credited to Austin Taylor), Warwick, Gold Eagle, Soncraft, and Apt.

He was influenced by such singers as Little Willie John, Clyde McPhatter and Jackie Wilson. At Duke, he made the first recording of the ballad "Be Ever Wonderful" in 1959.   Although he had several regional hits, and released an album, Ted Taylor Sings, on Warwick in 1963, he did not achieve national commercial success until his 1965 recording on Okeh Records of "Stay Away From My Baby" reached number 14 on the Billboard R&B chart and number 99 on the pop chart, his only national pop chart entry.  He also released three albums on Okeh, Be Ever Wonderful (1963), Blues & Soul (1965) and Ted Taylor's Greatest Hits (1966).

After further singles on Okeh, Epic, Atco and Jewel, Taylor signed for the Ronn label in 1967.  He remained on the label for seven years, and had several further R&B chart hits including "It's Too Late" (1969), "Something Strange is Going On in My House" (1970), and "How's Your Love Life Baby" (1971).  He also issued several albums, including You Can Dig It! and Taylor Made on Ronn.   His final chart hit: "Steal Away", was issued on the Alarm label of Shreveport, Louisiana in 1976.  He continued to record on his own Solpugids and SPG labels until his death.

Taylor died in a car crash in Lake Charles, Louisiana in 1987, aged 53.

Discography

Chart singles

Albums
 Ted Taylor Sings (Warwick #2049) (1961)
 Be Ever So Wonderful (Okeh #12104/14104) (1963)
 Blues and Soul (Okeh #12109/14109) (1965)
 Greatest Hits (Okeh #12113/14113) (1966)
 Shades of Blue (Ronn #LPS-7528) (1969)
 You Can Dig It! (Ronn #LPS-7529) (1970)
 Taylor Made (Ronn #LPS-7531) (1973)
 The Super Taylors (Ronn #LPS-7533) (1973) (with Little Johnny Taylor)
 Ted Taylor (Alarm #1000) (1976)
 Keeping My Head Above Water (MCA #305) (1978)
 Keep Walking On (Charly #CRB-1011) (France) (1980) (compilation album)
 Be Ever So Wonderful (Solpugdits #1001) (1985)
 Taylor Made For You (Solpugdits #1002) (1987)
 Somebody’s Always Trying (Mr. R&B #1005) (Sweden) (1987)

Sampling 
Taylor's music has been sampled throughout hip-hop. Most notably, Taylor's song "Be Ever Wonderful" was sampled by Ludacris in "Splash Waterfalls" from his 2003, fourth studio album, Chicken-n-Beer. Following that, Taylor's "Be Ever Wonderful" was sampled by Kendrick Lamar in "DUCKWORTH", from his Pulitzer Prize winning 2017, fourth studio album, DAMN.

Taylor's song "I Can't Fake It Anymore" from his 1978 album, Keeping My Head Above Water, was sampled by the hip-hop duo Dead Prez in their song "The Hood" (sometimes referred to as "For the Hood") from an advance version of their 2004, second studio album, RBG: Revolutionary but Gangsta.

References

External links

1934 births
1987 deaths
People from Okmulgee, Oklahoma
American soul singers
Singers from Oklahoma
Okeh Records artists
Road incident deaths in Louisiana
20th-century American singers
The Cadets (group) members
20th-century American male singers